Son of Spellsinger (1993) is a fantasy novel by American writer Alan Dean Foster. The book follows the continuing adventures of Jonathan Thomas Meriweather who is transported from our world into a land of talking animals and magic. It is the seventh book in the Spellsinger series.

Plot introduction
Rather than become a spellsinger like his father Jon-Tom, teenage Buncan decides to do his own thing, and puts together a band with Mudge and Weegee’s children that features rap music. Unfortunately for them it is Buncan and his band who possess the power to battle the sinister Grand Veritable.

External links

Alan Dean Foster homepage

References

1993 American novels
American fantasy novels
Novels by Alan Dean Foster
Spellsinger series